Gunter Gabriel (born Günter Caspelherr; 11 June 1942 – 22 June 2017) was a German singer, musician and composer.

Gabriel became famous in Germany as singer of Schlager songs. Gabriel lived in Harburg, Hamburg. He was a friend of Johnny Cash and introduced American Country music to German audiences, even covering some of Cash's songs in German.

Gabriel was married four times and had four children. He fell down a flight of stairs a couple of days before his death and died of complications that occurred after multiple surgeries to fix his broken neck.

Books
 2009: Gunter Gabriel, Oliver Flesch: Wer einmal tief im Keller saß. Erinnerungen eines Rebellen. Edel, Hamburg 2009, .

References

External links

  

1942 births
2017 deaths
German male singers
German composers
Schlager musicians
Ich bin ein Star – Holt mich hier raus! participants
Accidental deaths from falls
People from Harburg, Hamburg
Musicians from Hamburg